The Fording River is a tributary of the Elk River in the Canadian province of British Columbia. It is part of the Columbia River basin, as the Elk River is a tributary of the Kootenay River, which is a tributary of the Columbia River.

Course
The Fording River originates in the Rocky Mountains near Fording River Pass on the Continental Divide. It flows south, collecting numerous tributaries before joining the Elk River some distance north of Sparwood.

See also
List of British Columbia rivers
Tributaries of the Columbia River

References

Rivers of British Columbia
Tributaries of the Kootenay River
Rivers of the Canadian Rockies